The 1976 New Hampshire Wildcats football team was an American football team that represented the University of New Hampshire as a member of the Yankee Conference during the 1976 NCAA Division II football season. In its fifth year under head coach Bill Bowes, the team compiled an 8–3 record (4–1 against conference opponents), won the Yankee Conference championship, and lost to eventual national champion Montana State in the quarterfinal of the NCAA Division II Football Championship playoffs.

Schedule

Roster

References

New Hampshire
New Hampshire Wildcats football seasons
Yankee Conference football champion seasons
New Hampshire Wildcats football